Fraser may refer to:

Places

Antarctica
 Fraser Point, South Orkney Islands

Australia
 Fraser, Australian Capital Territory, a suburb in the Canberra district of Belconnen
 Division of Fraser (Australian Capital Territory), a former federal electoral division located in the Australian Capital Territory 
 Division of Fraser (Victoria), a current federal electoral division located in Victoria
 Fraser Island, along the coast of Queensland

Canada
 Fraser River
 Fraser Plateau, a subplateau of the Interior Plateau, named for the river
 Fraser Basin, a low-lying area, part of the Nechako Plateau, flanking the Fraser River in the Central Interior of British Columbia
 Fraser Canyon, the stretch of the Fraser River from the city of Williams Lake south to the town of Hope, British Columbia
 Fraser Valley, the region flanking the lowermost reaches of the Fraser River, from the town of Hope to the sea
 Fraser Plateau and Basin complex, a World Wildlife Fund-named ecoregion in the Central Interior of British Columbia
Fraser, British Columbia, a location on the Klondike Highway
Fraser, Edmonton, a neighbourhood
 Alex Fraser Bridge, between Delta and Richmond, British Columbia
 Fraser Range, a small mountain range north of Nugent Sound on the Central Coast of British Columbia
 Fraser Lake, British Columbia, a village in northern British Columbia

Malaysia
 Fraser's Hill

United States
 Fraser, Colorado 
 Fraser, Idaho 
 Fraser, Iowa 
 Fraser, Michigan, in Macomb County
 Fraser Township, Michigan, in Bay County
 Fraser Township, Minnesota
 Fraser, New York (disambiguation), various places

People
 Fraser (surname)
 Fraser Anning (born 1949), an Australian politician
 Fraser Barron  (1921–1944), an officer of the Royal New Zealand Air Force
 Fraser Wilkins (1908–1989), United States diplomat

Other uses
 Fraser fir, the tree species Abies fraseri
 FRASER (Federal Reserve Archival System for Economic Research), a digital archive of the economic history of the United States maintained by the Federal Reserve Bank of St. Louis

See also
 Bethel School District v. Fraser, a US legal case
 Fraser alphabet
 Fraser Institute, a free-market think tank
 Fraser and Neave, a Singapore-based business group
 Fraser syndrome, an autosomal recessive congenital disorder
 Frazier, surname
 Frazer (disambiguation)
 Frasier (disambiguation)
 Justice Fraser (disambiguation)